State Route 377 (SR 377) is a north–south state highway located in southeastern Ohio, a U.S. state.

Route description
State Route 377 runs through portions of Athens and Morgan Counties.  No part of this highway is incorporated within the National Highway System.

History
When the former State Route 77 was re-routed to the east of McConnelsville along what is now State Route 60 in 1934, the former stretch of State Route 77 between the former U.S. Route 50N (now State Route 550) northeast of Amesville and State Route 78 southwest of Malta was re-designated as State Route 377.  Since that time, there have been no changes of major significance to the routing of this state highway.

Major intersections

References

377
Transportation in Athens County, Ohio
Transportation in Morgan County, Ohio